Hyménée is a 1947 French drama film directed by Émile Couzinet. Starring Gaby Morlay, Maurice Escande, and Pierre Magnier, the film was shot in Bordeaux at the Studios de la Côte d'Argent in Gironde.

Plot
Although Pierre is married, he is in love with his sister in law Marianne, while he is loved by his cousin Agnés, a spinster. Marianne loves him but she prefers to marry Rémy, and ultimately Agnés leaves Pierre to his wife and kids.

Cast 
 Gaby Morlay as Agnès d'Aubarède
 Maurice Escande as Pierre Vairon
 Pierre Magnier as the general
 Colette Richard as Marianne
 Bernard Lancret as Rémi
 Alice Field as Juliette
 Gabrielle Robinne as Madame d'Aubarède
 Marthe Marsans as Madame Vairon
 Monette Pascale

References

External links
 
  Poster
  Plot

1947 films
French drama films
French black-and-white films
1947 drama films
1940s French films